Vân Phong Bay is a scenic area in Khánh Hòa Province, Vietnam. It is one of 21 Vietnam National Tourist Areas.

The area is the site of the planned Vân Phong Port.

References

Bays of Vietnam
Landforms of Khánh Hòa province